The Cornwall League 1 2008–09 was a full season of rugby union within Cornwall League 1.

Team Changes
Stithians as Champions, were promoted to the Tribute Cornwall/Devon League for season 2009–10. With an increase from 12 to 16 teams in the aforementioned league, St Austell and Liskeard-Looe were also promoted. The two Cornwall leagues will combine for next season and Camborne School of Mines, Illogan Park, Lankelly-Fowey, Redruth Albany, St Agnes, St Day and Veor will join the remaining teams for the following season.

Table

Points are awarded as follows:
 2 points for a win
 1 points for a draw
 0 points for a loss
Illogan Park withdrew at the start of the season after 14 players left the club

References

Cornwall
2008